Ingonish is a popular tourist destination in Victoria County, Cape Breton Island, Nova Scotia, Canada. The regional economy is tied to fishing and tourism. Tourist facilities include Cape Breton Highlands National Park, the Keltic Lodge, a downhill skiing centre, and a public golf course, the Highlands Links.

History
The name may be from the Portuguese or Mi'kmaq languages. French explorer Nicolas Denys visited the area in the 1600s, and he made note of the area's potential as a base of operations for French fishing fleets having good fishing though a harsh coastline and no safe harbour.
 
In 1854, local farmers plowing a field found an Acadian chapel bell, upon which was inscribed:

An 1885 English translation reads:

The bell was described as being "nearly as large around as an ordinary flour barrel" and weighed 586 pounds. It was ultimately lost after being sold to a foundry owner in Halifax. In another part of Ingonish, the remains of a second church were found. A small cannon of French origin, similar to those found at Neil’s Harbour was also found.

According to an official report sent to the Board of Trade in 1749 by Captain Smith, commander of the guard ship at Canso, there were 48 schooners and 393 shallops fishing the grounds off Ingonish. The community's population at that time was estimated to be approximately 300.

Mica was mined prior to the late 1800s.

Climate

Ingonish has a humid continental climate (Dfb) with extremely high precipitation for this climate (annual average precipitation being 69 inches, about the highest anywhere in Canada outside coastal British Columbia). Furthermore, Ingonish experiences its wettest months from November to January, with over 7.3 inches of precipitation each month, much of it falling as snow, while June and July are the driest months, but still averaging over 3.5 inches of precipitation each. Winters are long, cold, snowy and exceptionally stormy. In December and January, snow can fall nearly every day due to sea-effect snow showers which blow in from the unfrozen Gulf of St. Lawrence. Primarily from October to April, Ingonish is also prone to intense nor'easters - mid-latitude cyclones that approach from the U.S. Northeastern and New England states, bringing high winds and heavy precipitation, especially snowfall. As winter progresses, the surrounding waters become covered in ice which delays the onset of spring. Summer arrives quickly though, usually in mid to late June. The cold spring gives way to a beautiful summer, with lots of warm, sunny days. In summer, the weather pattern shifts to a warm southwest flow, and lasts into the fall. These warm southwest winds blow down-slope from the Cape Breton Highlands, drying out and warming as it descends. Although the surrounding water freezes during winter, it warms very quickly through the summer, with sea surface temperatures peaking around 21 °C (70 °F) in August. Weather data has been recorded at Parks Canada in Ingonish Beach since 1950. In 2000, Environment Canada upgraded the climate station to an automated weather station.

References

External links

Ingonish tourist information

Communities in Victoria County, Nova Scotia